Neštin is a village located in the Bačka Palanka municipality, in the South Bačka District of the autonomous province of Vojvodina, Serbia. Geographically, it is located the region of Syrmia. According to the 2011 census, the village has a population of 794 inhabitants. Also, vine produced in Neštin is famous.

Situated across the Danube from the municipality center, Neštin is a practical exclave, as the shortest road (9 km) linking it with Bačka Palanka (across the Ilok–Bačka Palanka Bridge) leads halfway through the territory of Croatia, and includes two border crossings. Tightened border regime due to Croatia's accession to the European Union in 2013 caused inconvenience for daily commuting of pupils and workers. Agriculture producers of Neštin were hit in particular, because transport of goods through Croatia was not permitted anymore without extensive paperwork.

Demographics

According to the last official census done in 2011, the village of Neštin has 794 inhabitants.

See also
 List of places in Serbia
 List of cities, towns and villages in Vojvodina

References
Slobodan Ćurčić, Broj stanovnika Vojvodine, Novi Sad, 1996.

External links 

 Neštin

Bačka Palanka
Populated places in Syrmia
South Bačka District